The Forest New Ground at Nottingham was a first-class cricket venue used by Nottingham Cricket Club in the late 18th and early 19th centuries.

Forest New Ground incorporated the old Forest Racecourse and in some sources the cricket venue is referred to as Forest Racecourse or else as "Forest Ground".

First recorded in 1771 for the Nottingham v Sheffield match, the Forest ground was used for cricket until 1979, although it was superseded for first-class matches by Trent Bridge from 1840.
It is owned by Nottingham City Council and is used for Football and the annual Goose Fair.

References

1771 establishments in England
Cricket grounds in Nottinghamshire
Cricket in Nottinghamshire
Defunct cricket grounds in England
Defunct sports venues in Nottinghamshire
English cricket in the 19th century
English cricket venues in the 18th century
Sports venues completed in 1771
Sports venues in Nottingham